Adam McLean (b. in Glasgow 27 April 1899; d. 1973) was a Scottish footballer, who played for Celtic, Sunderland, Aberdeen, and Partick Thistle. An outside-left, he was an integral part of the Celtic team of the 1920s. He provided many assists to Jimmy McGrory, the greatest British goalscorer of all time. In August 1928, after a dispute over terms, he departed Celtic Park with a great amount of hesitation for Sunderland before returning north again with Aberdeen. During the 1933 close season he was transferred to Partick Thistle.

References 

Celtic: A complete record 1888-1992 by Paul Lunney

1899 births
1973 deaths
Footballers from Glasgow
Association football wingers
Scottish footballers
Scotland international footballers
Scottish Football League players
English Football League players
Celtic F.C. players
Sunderland A.F.C. players
Aberdeen F.C. players
Partick Thistle F.C. players
Scottish Football League representative players
Date of death missing
Place of death missing